The 1838 Connecticut gubernatorial election was held on April 2, 1838. Former congressman and Whig nominee William W. Ellsworth was elected, defeating former speaker of the Connecticut House of Representatives and Democratic nominee Seth Preston Beers with 54.14% of the vote.

General election

Candidates
Major party candidates

William W. Ellsworth, Whig
Seth P. Beers, Democratic

Minor party candidates

Elisha Phelps, Conservative

Results

References

1838
Connecticut
Gubernatorial